The 2019 FIM Sidecarcross World Championship, the 40th edition of the competition.

Calendar

The Grand Prix calendar for the 2019 season:

Final standings 
The top ten teams in the final standings:

References

External links
 The World Championship on Sidecarcross.com
 FIM Sidecar Motocross World Championship

Sidecarcross World Championship seasons
Sidecarcross